1843 in archaeology

Explorations

Excavations
 Paul-Émile Botta begins excavations at Khorsabad.
 Amateur excavations of Jordan Hill Roman Temple in Dorset, England.

Finds
 Tomb of Menecrates (c. 600 BCE) on Corfu.
 Sarre Anglo-Saxon cemetery in Kent, England.

Publications
 Incidents of Travel in Yucatan by John Lloyd Stephens with illustrations by Frederick Catherwood
 The History of the Conquest of Mexico by William H. Prescott
 Mittelitalien vor den Zeiten der römischen Herrschaft, nach den Denkmälern by Wilhelm Ludwig Abeken

Events
 c. January: The Singapore Stone is blown up.
 September: The Alexander Mosaic is moved from Pompeii to Naples.
 British Archaeological Association founded.

Births
 June 4 - Charles Conrad Abbott, American archaeologist and naturalist (d. 1919)
 September 9 - Oscar Montelius, Swedish archaeologist (d. 1921)

Deaths
 January 29 - Wilhelm Ludwig Abeken, German Classical archaeologist (b. 1813)
 June 4 - Ippolito Rosellini, Tuscan Egyptologist (b. 1800)

See also
 List of years in archaeology
 1842 in archaeology
 1844 in archaeology

References

1843 archaeological discoveries
Archaeology by year
Archaeology